The 1984 Honduran Segunda División was the 18th season of the Honduran Segunda División.  Under the management of Alfredo Barahona, Tela Timsa won the tournament after finishing first in the final round (or Cuadrangular) and obtained promotion to the 1985–86 Honduran Liga Nacional.

Final round
Also known as Cuadrangular.

Standings

Known results

References

Segunda
1984